Carbon retirement involves retiring allowances from emission trading schemes as a method for offsetting carbon emissions. Under schemes such as the European Union Emission Trading Scheme, EU Emission Allowances (EUAs) represent the right to release carbon dioxide into the atmosphere, and are issued to all the largest polluters. Buying these allowances and permanently removing them forces industrial companies to reduce their emissions. Over time, the scheme will offer fewer allowances, making it much harder for industrial companies to sustain high emission levels without incurring financial penalties.

Unlike traditional offsetting projects, retirement is straightforward and transparent. There are no complex projects, methodologies, brokers or intermediaries and the issue of additionality is overcome.

References

Carbon finance